Svinesund is a sound separating the Swedish municipality of Strömstad in the province of Bohuslän in the county of Västra Götaland from the Norwegian municipality of Halden in the county of Viken.

Two bridges, the old and new Svinesund Bridge, span this sound of the Iddefjord. The Swedish side is extremely popular with Norwegians who flock to buy relatively cheap goods in Sweden, where a large shopping area can be found immediately after crossing the sound. Following the inauguration of the new bridge in June 2005, both the old and new bridges are toll bridges.

Norwegian and Swedish customs authorities have offices and checkpoints on their respective sides of the sound. While there is not normally any passport control on the border, vehicles crossing are regularly stopped and searched. Norway is not in the EU so there are much stricter restrictions on the amount of goods (e.g. alcohol, cigarettes, food, etc.) that can be taken across the border without stopping to pay customs duties than between EU countries. Customs duties are paid immediately after crossing the border using the new bridge.

References

External links

Webcam

Landforms of Västra Götaland County
Bohuslän
Landforms of Viken (county)
Sounds of Norway
Sounds of Sweden
Norway–Sweden border crossings
International straits